The Dëshmorët e Kombit Boulevard is a major thoroughfare in Tirana, Albania. It was initially designed by Armando Brasini in 1925. Brasini's master plan was later amended by Florestano di Fausto, and in 1939 by Gherardo Bosio following the Italian invasion of Albania. 

The wide thoroughfare was initially named after King Zog, and after the 1939 invasion was renamed  ("Avenue of the [Italian] Empire"). 
In 1934 to 1935, a bridge was built over the boulevard by Gjovalin Gjadri. During the communist era in Albania, major parades regularly took place including on Liberation Day and International Workers Day.

Many buildings are located along this boulevard, including the Presidential Palace, the Prime Minister's Office, the Palace of Congress, the Rogner Hotel and the University of Tirana. The boulevard enters the city centre from the south and intersects with Bajram Curri Boulevard near the Rinia Park. It then becomes part of Skanderbeg Square and continues north of the centre to Zogu I Boulevard.

The boulevard was immortalised by Edi Hila in a series of paintings titled Martyrs of the Nation Boulevard.

Gallery

See also
 Skanderbeg Square
 Mother Teresa Square (Tirana)

References 

Streets in Tirana
Buildings and structures in Tirana
Squares in Albania